Petrovče is a village on the left bank of the Savinja River in the Municipality of Žalec in east-central Slovenia. The area is part of the traditional region of Styria. The municipality is now included in the Savinja Statistical Region.

Church

The parish church in the settlement is dedicated to the Visitation of Mary and belongs to the Roman Catholic Diocese of Celje. It was built in the 18th century on the site of a 14th-century building.

References

External links

Petrovče at Geopedia

Populated places in the Municipality of Žalec